The UEFA European Under-18 Championship 1966 Final Tournament was held in Yugoslavia. The Soviet Union and Italy drew their final match and shared the title.

Qualification

|}

Teams
The following teams entered the tournament. Four teams qualified for the tournament (Q) and the other teams entered without playing qualification matches.

 
  (Q)
 
 
 
 
  (Q)
 
  (Q)
 
 
  (Q)
 
 
 
  (host)

Group stage

Group A

Group B

Group C

Group D

Semifinals

Third place match

Final

External links
Results by RSSSF

UEFA European Under-19 Championship
Under-18
1965–66 in Yugoslav football
1966
May 1966 sports events in Europe
1966 in Serbia
Football in Belgrade
1960s in Belgrade
1966 in youth association football
International sports competitions in Belgrade